Stenoma platyphylla is a moth of the family Depressariidae. It is found in French Guiana.

The wingspan is 17–18 mm. The forewings are brown, indistinctly and suffusedly streaked with darker and with a large green patch extending along the dorsum from the base to three-fourths and reaching more than half across the wing, edged above by a dark fuscous streak from the base to one-third of the wing. The hindwings are grey with the apical edge whitish ochreous.

References

Moths described in 1916
Taxa named by Edward Meyrick
Stenoma